

Events

Pre-1600
 690 – Empress Wu Zetian establishes the Zhou Dynasty of China.
1091 – London tornado of 1091: A tornado thought to be of strength T8/F4 strikes the heart of London.
1346 – The English capture King David II of Scotland at Neville's Cross and imprison him for eleven years.
1448 – An Ottoman army defeats a Hungarian army at the Second Battle of Kosovo.
1456 – The University of Greifswald is established as the second oldest university in northern Europe.
1534 – Anti-Catholic posters appear in Paris and other cities supporting Huldrych Zwingli's position on the Mass.
1558 – Poczta Polska, the Polish postal service, is founded.

1601–1900
1604 – Kepler's Supernova is observed in the constellation of Ophiuchus.
1610 – French king Louis XIII is crowned in Reims Cathedral.
1660 – The nine regicides who signed the death warrant of Charles I of England are hanged, drawn and quartered.
1662 – Charles II of England sells Dunkirk to Louis XIV of France for 40,000 pounds.
1713 – Great Northern War: Russia defeated Sweden in the Battle of Kostianvirta in Pälkäne.
1771 – Premiere in Milan of the opera Ascanio in Alba, composed by Mozart at age 15.
1777 – American Revolutionary War: British General John Burgoyne surrenders his army at Saratoga, New York.
1781 – American Revolutionary War: British General Charles, Earl Cornwallis surrenders at the Siege of Yorktown.
1800 – War of the Second Coalition: Britain takes control of the Dutch colony of Curaçao.
1806 – Former leader of the Haitian Revolution, Emperor Jacques I, is assassinated after an oppressive rule.
1811 – The silver deposits of Agua Amarga are discovered in Chile becoming in the following years instrumental for the Patriots to finance the Chilean War of Independence. 
1814 – Eight people die in the London Beer Flood.
1850 – Riots start, which lead to a massacre in Aleppo.
1860 – First The Open Championship (referred to in North America as the British Open).
1861 – Aboriginal Australians kill nineteen Europeans in the Cullin-la-ringo massacre.

1901–present
1907 – Marconi begins the first commercial transatlantic wireless service.
1912 – Bulgaria, Greece and Serbia declare war on the Ottoman Empire, joining Montenegro in the First Balkan War.
1919 – Leeds United F.C. founded at Salem Chapel, Holbeck after the winding up of Leeds City F.C. for making illegal payments to players during World War I
1931 – Al Capone is convicted of income tax evasion.
1933 – Albert Einstein flees Nazi Germany and moves to the United States.
1940 – The body of Communist propagandist Willi Münzenberg is found in South France, starting a never-resolved mystery.
1941 – World War II: The USS Kearny becomes the first U.S. Navy vessel to be torpedoed by a U-boat.
1943 – The Burma Railway (Burma–Thailand Railway) is completed.
  1943   – Nazi Holocaust in Poland: Sobibór extermination camp is closed.
1945 – A massive demonstration in Buenos Aires, Argentina, demands Juan Perón's release.
1952 – Indonesian Army elements surrounded the Merdeka Palace demanding President Sukarno disband the Provisional People's Representative Council.
1956 – The first commercial nuclear power station is officially opened by Queen Elizabeth II in Sellafield, England.
1961 – Directed by their chief Maurice Papon, Paris police massacre scores of Algerian protesters.
1961 – The first attempt of the apartheid analogy by Ahmad Shukeiri. 
1965 – The 1964–65 New York World's Fair closes after two years and more than 51 million attendees.
1966 – The 23rd Street Fire in New York City kills 12 firefighters.
1969 – The Caravaggio painting Nativity with St. Francis and St. Lawrence is stolen from the Oratory of Saint Lawrence in Palermo.
1970 – FLQ terrorists murder Quebec Vice-Premier and Minister of Labour Pierre Laporte.
1973 – OPEC imposes an oil embargo against countries they deem to have helped Israel in the Yom Kippur War.
1977 – The hijacked Lufthansa Flight 181 lands in Mogadishu. The remaining hostages are later rescued.
1979 – Mother Teresa is awarded the Nobel Peace Prize.
  1979   – The Department of Education Organization Act creates the U.S. Department of Education.
1980 – As part of the Holy See–United Kingdom relations a British monarch makes the first state visit to the Vatican.
1988 – Uganda Airlines Flight 775 crashes at Rome–Fiumicino International Airport, in Rome, Italy, killing 33 people.
1989 – The 6.9  Loma Prieta earthquake shakes the San Francisco Bay Area and the Central Coast, killing 63.
  1989   – The East German Politburo votes to remove Erich Honecker from his role as General Secretary.
1991 – 1991 Rudrapur bombings by Sikh separatists, who explode two bombs, during a Ramlila Hindu celebration in Rudrapur, Uttarakhand, killing 41 people.
1992 – Having gone to the wrong house, Japanese student Yoshihiro Hattori is killed by the homeowner in Baton Rouge, Louisiana.
1994 – Russian journalist Dmitry Kholodov is assassinated while investigating corruption in the armed forces.
2000 – The Hatfield rail crash leads to the collapse of Railtrack.
2001 – Israeli tourism minister Rehavam Ze'evi becomes the first Israeli minister to be assassinated in a terrorist attack.
2003 – Taipei 101, a 101-floor skyscraper in Taipei, becomes the world's tallest high-rise.
2017 – Syrian civil war: The Syrian Democratic Forces (SDF) capture the last foothold of the Islamic State of Iraq and the Levant (ISIL) in Raqqa, marking the end of the Battle of Raqqa.
2018 – The recreational use of cannabis is legalized in Canada.
  2018   – A mass shooting and bombing at Kerch Polytechnic College in Crimea kills 21 people including the attacker and injures 70 others.
2019 – Drug dealers in Culiacan, Sinaloa, Mexico force the government to back down on an arrest.
2019 – The 17 October Revolution starts in Lebanon.

Births

Pre-1600
 503 – Lý Nam Đế, first emperor of Vietnam (d. 548)
1253 – Ivo of Kermartin, French priest and saint (d. 1303)
1493 – Bartolommeo Bandinelli, Italian sculptor (d. 1560)
1500 – Alonso de Orozco Mena, Spanish Roman Catholic priest (d. 1591)
1538 – Irene di Spilimbergo, Italian Renaissance poet and painter (d. 1559)
1577 – Cristofano Allori, Italian painter (d. 1621)
  1577   – Dmitry Pozharsky, Russian prince (d. 1642)
1582 – Johann Gerhard, German theologian and academic (d. 1637)
1587 – Nathan Field, English dramatist and actor (d. 1620)

1601–1900
1623 – Francis Turretin, Swiss-Italian minister, theologian, and academic (d. 1687)
1629 – Balthasar Charles, Prince of Asturias (d. 1646)
1688 – Domenico Zipoli, Italian missionary and composer (d. 1726)
1711 – Jupiter Hammon, American poet (d. 1806)
1719 – Jacques Cazotte, French author and academic (d. 1792)
1720 – Maria Teresa Agnesi Pinottini, Italian harpsichord player and composer (d. 1795) 
1725 – John Wilkes, English journalist and politician (d. 1797)
1729 – Pierre-Alexandre Monsigny, French composer and academic (d. 1817)
1735 – Franz Xaver Feuchtmayer the Younger, German Baroque artist (d. 1803)
1759 – Andrey Voronikhin, Russian architect and painter (d. 1814)
1760 – Claude Henri de Rouvroy, comte de Saint-Simon, French economist and philosopher (d. 1825)
1768 – Sophie von Dönhoff, morganatic spouse by bigamy to King Frederick William II of Prussia (d. 1838)
1779 – Louis Charles, French prince of the blood (d. 1808)
  1779   – José Andrés Pacheco de Melo, Argentine statesman and priest (d. approx. 1820)
1780 – Richard Mentor Johnson, American politician, ninth Vice President of the United States (d. 1850)
1781 – Johann Friedrich Meckel, German anatomist (d. 1833)
1784 – Fructuoso Rivera, first president of Uruguay (d. 1854)
1785 – Christen Smith, Norwegian scientist (d. 1816)
1792 – John Bowring, English polyglot and governor of Hong Kong (d. 1826)
1797 – Juan Lavalle, Argentine politician (d.1841)
1803 – Ferenc Deák, Hungarian politician (d. 1876)
1810 – Adolphe-Félix Cals, French painter (d. 1880)
1811 – Albertus van Raalte, Dutch-American pastor and educator (d. 1876)
1813 – Georg Büchner, German-Swiss poet and playwright (d. 1837)
1814 – Yakiv Holovatsky, Ukrainian historian, scholar, and poet (d. 1888)
1817 – Syed Ahmad Khan, Indian philosopher and scholar (d. 1898)
1821 – Alexander Gardner, Scottish photographer (d. 1882)
1828 – Aureliano Maestre de San Juan, Spanish scientist (d. 1890)
1833 – José E. Días, Paraguayan general (d. 1867)
1835 – Louis-Léon Cugnot, French sculptor (d. 1894)
  1835   – Paul Haenlein, German mechanical engineer (d.1905)
1840 – André Gill, French caricaturist (d. 1885)
1844 – Gustave Schlumberger, French historian (d. 1929)
1845 – John J. Gardner, American politician (d. 1921)
1853 – Grand Duchess Maria Alexandrovna of Russia (d. 1920)
1859 – Childe Hassam, American painter and illustrator (d. 1935)
1860 – Henry Campbell Black, founder of Black's Law Dictionary (d. 1927)
1864 – Elinor Glyn, English author, screenwriter, and producer (d. 1943)
1865 – James Rudolph Garfield, American lawyer and politician, 23rd United States Secretary of the Interior (d. 1950)
1867 – Josep Puig i Cadafalch, Catalan architect who designed the Casa Martí (d. 1956)
1871 – Segundo de Chomón, Spanish cinematographer, director, and screenwriter (d.1929)
1876 – Hippolyte Aucouturier, French road cyclist (d. 1944)
1878 – Jacobo Fitz-James Stuart, Spanish politician and 17th Duke of Alba (d. 1953)
1880 – Jesús Reyes Ferreira, Mexican artist and art collector (d. 1977)
1881 – Maria Dulęba, Polish actress (d. 1959)
1882 – Haritina Korotkevich, Russian war heroine (d. 1904)
1883 – Alexander Neill, Scottish educator (d. 1973)
  1883   – Thaddeus Shideler, American hurdler (d. 1966)
1886 – Spring Byington, American actress (d. 1971)
1889 – Mikha'il Na'ima, Lebanese author (d. 1988)
1890 – Roy Kilner, English cricketer (d. 1928)
1892 – Theodor Eicke, German SS general (d. 1943)
  1892   – Herbert Howells, English organist, composer, and educator (d. 1983)
1893 – Raffaele Bendandi, Italian clockmaker and seismologist (d. 1979)
1894 – Prince René, Italian Prince of Denmark (d. 1962)
  1894   – Pablo de Rokha, Chilean poet (d. 1968)
1895 – Miguel Ydígoras Fuentes, President of Guatemala (1958–1963) (d. 1982)
  1895   – Doris Humphrey, American dancer and choreographer (d. 1958)
1896 – Roman Petrovich, Russian prince (d. 1978)
1898 – Shinichi Suzuki, Japanese violinist and educator (d. 1998)
  1898   – Eileen Sedgwick, American actress (d. 1991)
  1898   – Simon Vestdijk, Dutch author and poet (d. 1971)
1900 – C. C. van Asch van Wijck, Dutch artist and sculptor (d. 1932)
  1900   – Jean Arthur, American actress (d. 1991)
  1900   – Yvor Winters, American critic and poet (d. 1968)

1901–present
1901 – Emma Gamboa Alvarado, Costa Rican educator (d. 1973)
1902 – Irene Ryan, American actress (d. 1973)
1903 – Andrei Grechko, Soviet general (d. 1976)
  1903   – Nathanael West, American author and screenwriter (d. 1940)
1905 – Leopoldo Benites, Ecuadorian diplomat 28th president of the United Nations General Assembly (d. 1996)
1906 – Andrey Tikhonov, Soviet and Russian mathematician (d. 1993)
  1906   – Paul Derringer, American baseball player (d. 1987)
1907 – John Marley, American actor (d. 1984)
1908 – Hjördis Petterson, Swedish actress (d. 1988)
  1908   – Wally Prigg, Australian rugby league player (d. 1980)
  1908   – Red Rolfe, American baseball player, coach, and manager (d. 1969)
  1908   – Kenji Miyamoto, Japanese politician (d. 2007)
1909 – Cozy Cole, American drummer (d. 1981)
  1909   – Leopoldo Panero, Spanish poet (d. 1962)
  1909   – Joaquín Satrústegui, Spanish lawyer and politician (d. 1992)
1910 – Ester Wier, American author (d. 2000)
  1910   – Marina Núñez del Prado, Bolivian sculptor (d. 1995)
1912 – Pope John Paul I,  Catholic pope from August  1978- September 1978 (d. 1978)
  1912   – Theodore Marier, American composer and educator, founded the Boston Archdiocesan Choir School (d. 2001)
  1912   – Jack Owens, American singer-songwriter and pianist (d. 1982)
1913 – Faik Türün, Turkish general (d. 2003)
  1913   – Robert Lowery, American actor (d. 1971)
  1913   – Marian Marsh, Trinidadian-American actress and environmentalist (d. 2006)
1914 – Jerry Siegel, American author and illustrator (d. 1996)
1915 – Arthur Miller, American playwright and screenwriter (d. 2005)
1916 – José López Rega, Argentinean politician  (d. 1989)
1917 – Adele Stimmel Chase, American painter and sculptor (d. 2000)
  1917   – Martin Donnelly, New Zealand cricketer (d. 1999) 
  1917   – Sumner Locke Elliott, Australian-American author and playwright (d. 1991)
  1917   – Marsha Hunt, American actress and singer (d. 2022)
  1917   – Aimo Koivunen, Finnish soldier and corporal (d. 1989)
  1917   – Norman Leyden, American composer and conductor (d. 2014)
  1917   – Alfred Benlloch Llorach, Spanish inventor (d. 2013)
1918 – Rita Hayworth, American actress, singer and dancer (d. 1987)
  1918   – Ralph Wilson, American businessman, founded the Buffalo Bills (d. 2014)
  1918   – Luis Alberto Solari, Uruguayan artist (d. 1993)
1919 – Isaak Khalatnikov, Ukrainian-Russian theoretical physicist and academic (d. 2021)
  1919   – Violet Milstead, Canadian World War II aviator and bush pilot (d. 2014)
  1919   – Zhao Ziyang, Chinese politician (d. 2005)
1920 – Montgomery Clift, American actor (d. 1966)
  1920   – Miguel Delibes, Spanish journalist and author (d. 2010)
  1920   – Zully Moreno, Argentine actress (d. 1999)
1921 – George Mackay Brown, Scottish author, poet, and playwright (d. 1996)
  1921   – Priscilla Buckley, American journalist and author (d. 2012)
  1921   – Maria Gorokhovskaya, Russian-Israeli gymnast (d. 2001)
  1921   – Tom Poston, American actor and comedian (d. 2007)
1922 – Luiz Bonfá, Brazilian guitarist and composer (d. 2001)
  1922   – Pierre Juneau, Canadian broadcaster and politician, co-founded the Montreal World Film Festival (d. 2012)
1923 – Barney Kessel, American guitarist and composer (d. 2004)
  1923   – Charles McClendon, American football player and coach (d. 2001)
1924 – Don Coryell, American football player and coach (d. 2010)
  1924   – Anton Geiser, Croatian SS officer (d. 2012)
  1924   – Giacomo Mari, Italian footballer (d. 1991)
  1924   – Rolando Panerai, Italian baritone (d. 2019)
1925 – Harry Carpenter, English sportscaster (d. 2010)
1926 – Julie Adams, American actress (d. 2019)
  1926   – Beverly Garland, American actress (d. 2008)
  1926   – Roberto Lippi, Italian race car driver (d. 2011)
  1928   – Santiago Stevenson, Panamanian singer and minister (d. 2007)
  1928   – Alejandro Végh Villegas, Uruguayan politician (d. 2017)
1929 – Mário Wilson, Mozambican footballer and manager (d. 2016)
1930 – Ismail Akbay, Turkish physicist and engineer (d. 2003)
  1930   – Robert Atkins, American physician and cardiologist, created the Atkins diet (d. 2003)
1931 – Ernst Hinterberger, Austrian author and playwright (d. 2012)
  1931   – José Alencar, Brazilian businessman and politician (d. 2011)
  1931   – Anatoly Pristavkin, Russian writer (d. 2008)
  1932   – Paul Anderson, American weightlifter (d. 1994)
1933 – William Anders, Hong Kong-American general and astronaut
  1933   – The Singing Nun, Belgian singer-songwriter, guitarist, and nun (d. 1985)
1934 – Alan Garner, English author and playwright
  1934   – Johnny Haynes, English-Scottish footballer (d. 2005)
  1934   – Rico Rodriguez, Jamaican trombonist (d. 2015)
1935 – Sydney Chapman, English architect and politician, Vice-Chamberlain of the Household (d. 2014)
  1935   – Michael Eavis, English farmer, founded the Glastonbury Festival
  1935   – Carlos Pairetti, Argetine racing driver (d. 2022)
1936 – Sathima Bea Benjamin, South African singer-songwriter (d. 2013)
  1936   – Hiroo Kanamori, Japanese-American seismologist and academic
  1936   – Santiago Navarro, Spanish basketball player (d. 1993)
  1936   – Bert Nievera, Filipino-American singer (d. 2018)
1937 – Paxton Whitehead, English actor
  1937   – José María Álvarez del Manzano, Spanish politician
  1937   – Aida Navarro, Venezuelan mezzo-soprano
  1937   – Renato Prada Oropeza, Bolivian-Mexican scientist (d. 2011)
1938 – Evel Knievel, American motorcycle rider and stuntman (d. 2007)
  1938   – Les Murray, Australian anthologist, poet, and critic (d. 2019)
  1938   – António Calvário, Portuguese singer and artist
1939 – Oliver Rackham, English botanist and academic (d. 2015)
1940 – Stephen Kovacevich, American pianist and conductor
  1940   – Jim Smith, English footballer and manager (d. 2019)
  1940   – Peter Stringfellow, English businessman (d. 2018)
1941 – Earl Thomas Conley, American country singer-songwriter and guitarist (d. 2019)
  1941   – Jim Seals, American singer-songwriter, guitarist, and violinist
  1941   – Paul Ellison, American musician
1942 – Steve Jones, American basketball player and sportscaster (d. 2017)
  1942   – Gary Puckett, American pop singer-songwriter and guitarist
1943 – Ignacio Rupérez, Spanish diplomat and journalist (d. 2015)
1944 – Ángel Cristo, Spanish circus performer (d. 2010)
1946 – Ronni Chasen, American publicist (d. 2010)
  1946   – Michael Hossack, American drummer (d. 2012)
  1946   – Cameron Mackintosh, English producer and manager
  1946   – Adam Michnik, Polish journalist and historian
  1946   – Drusilla Modjeska, English-Australian author and critic
  1946   – Bob Seagren, American pole vaulter
  1946   – Manuel "Flaco" Ibáñez, Mexican actor and comedian
  1946   – Julio Miranda, Argentine politician (d. 2021)
  1946   – Daniela Payssé, Uruguayan politician (d. 2018)
  1946   – José Perramón, Spanish handball player
  1946   – Jaime Ravinet, Chilean politician
  1946   – Rüdiger Wittig, German geobotanist and ecologist
  1946   – Akira Kushida, Japanese vocalist
1947 – Gene Green, American lawyer and politician
  1947   – Michael McKean, American singer-songwriter, actor, and director
  1947   – Robert Post, American educator and academic
  1947   – Omar Azziman, adviser to the King of Morocco
1948 – Robert Jordan, American soldier and author (d. 2007)
  1948   – Margot Kidder, Canadian-American actress (d. 2018)
  1948   – George Wendt, American actor and comedian
  1948   – Osvaldo Castro, Chilean footballer
1949 – Owen Arthur, Barbadian economist and politician, 5th Prime Minister of Barbados (d. 2020)
  1949   – Bill Hudson, American musician and actor
1950 – Philippe Barbarin, French cardinal
  1950   – Howard Rollins, American actor (d. 1996)
  1950   – Sandra Reemer, Indo-Dutch singer (d. 2017)
1951 – Annie Borckink, Dutch speed skater
  1951   – Roger Pontare, Swedish singer
  1951   – Shari Ulrich, American-Canadian singer-songwriter and violinist
  1951   – Dirk Beheydt, Belgian footballer
1953 – Joseph Bowie, American trombonist and bandleader 
  1953   – Domenico Penzo, Italian footballer
1954 – Carlos Buhler, American mountaineer
1955 – Georgios Alogoskoufis, Greek economist, academic, and politician, Greek Minister of Finance
  1955   – Mike Bratz, American basketball player
1956 – Fran Cosmo, American singer-songwriter and guitarist 
  1956   – Mae Jemison, American physician, academic, and astronaut
  1956   – Pat McCrory, American businessman and politician, 74th Governor of North Carolina
  1956   – Stephen Palumbi, American academic and author
1957 – Lawrence Bender, American actor and producer
  1957   – Steve McMichael, American football player, wrestler, and sportscaster
  1957   – Vincent Van Patten, American tennis player and actor
  1957   – Antonio Galdo, Italian journalist
  1957   – Nelson Barrera, Mexican baseball player (d. 2002)
  1957   – Pino Palladino, Welsh bassist
  1957   – Eleftheria Arvanitaki, Greek folk singer
1958 – Howard Alden, American guitarist
  1958   – Alan Jackson, American singer-songwriter
  1958   – Craig Murray, British diplomat
  1958   – Sandra Mozarowsky, Spanish actress (d. 1977)
1959 – Ron Drummond, American author and scholar
  1959   – Francisco Flores Pérez, Salvadorian politician, President of El Salvador (d. 2016)
  1959   – Russell Gilbert, Australian comedian, actor, and screenwriter
  1959   – Norm Macdonald, Canadian actor, comedian, producer, and screenwriter (d. 2021)
  1959   – Mark Peel, Australian historian and academic
  1959   – Richard Roeper, American journalist and critic
  1959   – Mustafa Aberchán, Spanish politician
  1959   – Eugenio Hernández Flores, Mexican politician
1960 – Guy Henry, English actor
  1960   – Rob Marshall, American director, producer, and choreographer
  1960   – Bernie Nolan, Irish singer (d. 2013)
  1960   – Philippe Sands, American lawyer and academic
1961 – David Means, American short story writer
1962 – Glenn Braggs, American baseball player
  1962   – Mike Judge, American animator, director, screenwriter, producer and actor
  1962   – Jay Humphries, American basketball player
1963 – Sergio Goycochea, Argentinian footballer and journalist
  1963   – Toby Young, English journalist and academic
1964 – Gregg Wallace, English television presenter
  1964   – Margarita Liborio Arrazola, Mexican politician
1965 – Aravinda de Silva, Sri Lankan cricketer
  1965   – Rhys Muldoon, Australian actor
1966 – Shaun Edwards, English rugby player and coach
  1966   – Danny Ferry, American basketball player and manager
  1966   – Mark Gatiss, English actor, screenwriter and novelist
  1966   – Tommy Kendall, American race car driver and sportscaster
1967 – Simon Segars, English businessman
  1967   – Nathalie Tauziat, French tennis player
  1967   – René Dif, Danish musician
  1967   – Pedro González Vera, Chilean footballer
1968 – Graeme Le Saux, English footballer and sportscaster
  1968   – Ziggy Marley, Jamaican singer-songwriter, guitarist, and voice actor
  1968   – David Robertson, Scottish footballer and manager
  1968   – Alejandra Ávalos, Mexican artist
1969 – Ernie Els, South African golfer and sportscaster
  1969   – Jesús Ángel García, Spanish racewalker
  1969   – Wyclef Jean, Haitian-American rapper, producer, and actor
  1969   – Rick Mercer, Canadian comedian, actor, producer, and screenwriter
  1969   – Wood Harris, American actor
1970 – Anil Kumble, Indian cricketer
  1970   – John Mabry, American baseball player, coach, and sportscaster
  1970   – J. C. MacKenzie, Canadian actor
1971 – Blues Saraceno, American guitarist, songwriter, and producer 
  1971   – Chris Kirkpatrick, American singer-songwriter and dancer
  1971   – Kim Ljung, Norwegian singer-songwriter and bass player
  1971   – Martin Heinrich, American politician
  1971   – Derrick Plourde, American drummer (d. 2005)
1972 – Eminem, American rapper, producer, and actor 
  1972   – Tarkan, German-Turkish singer
  1972   – Akio "Musashi" Mori, Japanese karateka and kickboxer
1973 – Andrea Tarozzi, Italian footballer and coach
  1973   – Rubén Garcés, Panamanian basketball player
1974 – Ariel Levy, American journalist and author
  1974   – Matthew Macfadyen, English actor
  1974   – Obdulio Ávila Mayo, Mexican politician
  1974   – Bárbara Paz, Brazilian actress
  1974   – Janne Puurtinen, Finnish keyboard player
  1974   – John Rocker, American baseball player
  1974   – Darío Sala, Argentine footballer
  1974   – Gabriel Silberstein, Chilean tennis player
  1974   – Dhondup Wangchen, Chinese director and producer
1975 – Francis Bouillon, American-Canadian ice hockey player
  1975   – Jericó Abramo Masso, Mexican politician
  1975   – Vina Morales, Filipino actress and singer
1976 – Sebastián Abreu, Uruguayan footballer
  1976   – Seth Etherton, American baseball player
  1976   – Carlos Loret de Mola, Mexican journalist
  1976   – Kevin Maher, English-Irish footballer and coach
1977 – Dudu Aouate, Israeli footballer 
  1977   – Alimi Ballard, American actor and producer
  1977   – Bryan Bertino, American actor, director, producer, and screenwriter
  1977   – Walter Calderón, Ecuadorian footballer
  1977   – Marko Antonio Cortés Mendoza, Mexican politician
  1977   – Ryan McGinley, American photographer
  1977   – André Villas-Boas, Portuguese footballer and manager
1978 – Pablo Iglesias Turrión, Spanish politician
  1978   – Jerry Flannery, Irish rugby player and coach
  1978   – Erin Karpluk, Canadian actress
  1978   – Chuka Umunna, English lawyer and politician
1979 – Marcela Bovio, Mexican singer-songwriter and violinist 
  1979   – Alexandros Nikolaidis, Greek martial artist (d. 2022)
  1979   – Kimi Räikkönen, Finnish race car driver
  1979   – Kostas Tsartsaris, Greek basketball player
1980 – Yekaterina Gamova, Russian volleyball player
  1980   – Mohammad Hafeez, Pakistani cricketer
  1980   – Isaac Mina, Ecuadorian footballer
  1980   – Angel Parker, American actress
  1980   – Alessandro Piccolo, Italian race car driver
  1980   – Justin Shenkarow, American actor
1981 – Horacio Cervantes, Mexican footballer
  1981   – Kurumi Enomoto, Japanese singer-songwriter
  1981   – Tsubasa Imai, Japanese singer, actor, and dancer
  1981   – Ben Rothwell, American mixed-martial artist
1982 – Rubén Ramírez, Argentine footballer
  1982   – Nick Riewoldt, Australian footballer
  1982   – Marion Rolland, alpine ski racer
1983 – Michelle Ang, New Zealander actress
  1983   – Milica Brozovic, Serbian-Russian figure skater
  1983   – Felicity Jones, English actress
  1983   – Toshihiro Matsushita, Japanese footballer
  1983   – Riki Miura, Japanese actor
  1983   – Junichi Miyashita, Japanese swimmer
  1983   – Ivan Saenko, Russian footballer
  1983   – Mitch Talbot, American baseball player
  1983   – Vitali Teleš, Estonian footballer
1984 – Chris Lowell, American actor
  1984   – Giovanni Marchese, Italian footballer
  1984   – Randall Munroe, American author and illustrator
  1984   – Luke Rockhold, American mixed martial artist
  1984   – Anja Eline Skybakmoen,  Norwegian singer-songwriter and bandleader
  1984   – Gottfrid Svartholm, Swedish computer specialist
  1984   – Jared Tallent, Australian race walker
1985 – Carlos González, Venezuelan baseball player
  1985   – Max Irons, English-Irish actor
  1985   – Collins John, Dutch footballer
  1985   – Tomokazu Nagira, Japanese footballer
1986 – Alexandre Bonnet, French footballer
  1986   – Antoni Bou, Spanish motorcyclist
  1986   – Aija Brumermane, Latvian basketball player
  1986   – Constant Djakpa, Ivorian footballer
  1986   – Yannick Ponsero, French figure skater
  1986   – Nicolás Richotti, Argentine basketball player
1987 – Bea Alonzo, Filipino actress and singer
  1987   – Jarosław Fojut, Polish footballer
  1987   – Elliot Grandin, French footballer
  1987   – Hideto Takahashi, Japanese footballer
1988 – Sergiy Gladyr, Ukrainian basketball player
  1988   – Tori Matsuzaka, Japanese actor and model
  1988   – Marina Salas, Spanish actress
1989 – Débora García, Spanish footballer
  1989   – Oleksandr Isakov, Ukrainian swimmer
  1989   – Sophie Luck, Australian actress
  1989  – Charles Oliveira, Brazilian mixed martial artist
  1989   – David Timor, Spanish footballer
1990 – Paolo Campinoti, Italian footballer
  1990   – Maica García Godoy, Spanish water polo player
  1990   – Ronald González Tabilo, Chilean footballer
  1990   – Saki Kumagai, Japanese footballer
  1990   – Patrick Lambie, South African rugby player
1991 – Brenda Asnicar, Argentine actress
1992 – Sam Concepcion, Filipino musician and dancer
  1992   – Keerthy Suresh, Indian actress
1993 – Kenneth Omeruo, Nigerian footballer
2001 – Thomas Strudwick, British motorcycle road racer

Deaths

Pre-1600
AD 33 – Agrippina the Elder, Roman wife of Germanicus (b. 14 BC)
 532 – Pope Boniface II
 866 – Al-Musta'in, Abbasid caliph (b. 836)
1271 – Steinvör Sighvatsdóttir, Icelandic aristocrat and poet
1277 – Beatrice of Falkenburg, German queen consort (b. c. 1254)
1346 – John Randolph, 3rd Earl of Moray
1346 – Maurice de Moravia, Earl of Strathearn
1456 – Nicolas Grenon, French composer (b. 1375)
1485 – John Scott of Scott's Hall, Warden of the Cinque Ports
1552 – Andreas Osiander, German Protestant theologian (b. 1498)
1575 – Gaspar Cervantes de Gaeta, Spanish cardinal (b. 1511)
1586 – Philip Sidney, English courtier, poet, and general (b. 1554)
1587 – Francesco I de' Medici, Grand Duke of Tuscany (b. 1541)

1601–1900
1616 – John Pitts, English priest and scholar (b. 1560)
1660 – Adrian Scrope, English colonel and politician (b. 1601)
1673 – Thomas Clifford, 1st Baron Clifford of Chudleigh, English politician, Lord High Treasurer of England (b. 1630)
1690 – Margaret Mary Alacoque, French mystic (b. 1647)
1757 – René Antoine Ferchault de Réaumur, French entomologist and academic (b. 1683)
1776 – Pierre François le Courayer, French-English theologian and author (b. 1681)
1780 – William Cookworthy, English pharmacist and minister (b. 1705)
1781 – Edward Hawke, 1st Baron Hawke, English admiral (b. 1705)
1786 – Johann Ludwig Aberli, Swiss painter and illustrator (b. 1723)
1806 – Jean-Jacques Dessalines, Haitian commander and politician, Governor-General of Haiti (b. 1758)
1836 – Orest Kiprensky, Russian painter (b. 1782)
1837 – Johann Nepomuk Hummel, Austrian pianist and composer (b. 1778)
1849 – Frédéric Chopin, Polish pianist and composer (b. 1810)
1868 – Laura Secord, Canadian war heroine (b. 1775)
1887 – Gustav Kirchhoff, German physicist and chemist (b. 1824)
1889 – Nikolay Chernyshevsky, Russian philosopher and critic (b. 1828)
1893 – Patrice de MacMahon, Duke of Magenta, French general and politician, 3rd President of France (b. 1808)

1901–present
1910 – Julia Ward Howe, American poet and songwriter (b. 1819)
1918 – Malak Hifni Nasif, Egyptian poet and author (b. 1886)
1920 – Michael Fitzgerald (Irish republican) died on Hunger Strike (b. 1881)
1928 – Frank Dicksee, English painter and illustrator (b. 1853)
1931 – Alfons Maria Jakob, German neurologist and academic (b. 1884)
1937 – J. Bruce Ismay, English businessman (b. 1862)
1938 – Karl Kautsky, Czech-German journalist, philosopher, and theoretician (b. 1854)
1948 – Royal Cortissoz, American art critic (b. 1869)
1955 – Dimitrios Maximos, Greek banker and politician (b. 1873)
1956 – Anne Crawford, Israeli-English actress (b. 1920)
1957 – Wilhelmina Hay Abbott, Scottish suffragist and feminist (b. 1884)
1958 – Paul Outerbridge, American photographer (b. 1896)
  1958   – Charlie Townsend, English cricketer and lawyer (b. 1876)
1962 – Natalia Goncharova, Russian painter, costume designer, and set designer (b. 1882)
1963 – Jacques Hadamard, French mathematician and academic (b. 1865)
1965 – Bart King, American cricketer (b. 1873)
1966 – Sidney Hatch, American runner and soldier (b. 1883)
  1966   – Wieland Wagner, German director and manager (b. 1917)
1967 – Puyi, Chinese emperor (b. 1906)
1970 – Pierre Laporte, Canadian journalist, lawyer, and politician (b. 1921)
  1970   – Vola Vale, American actress (b. 1897)
  1970   – Quincy Wright, American political scientist and academic (b. 1890)
1972 – Turk Broda, Canadian ice hockey player and coach (b. 1914)
  1972   – George, Crown Prince of Serbia (b. 1887)
1973 – Ingeborg Bachmann, Austrian author and poet (b. 1926)
1978 – George Clark, American race car driver (b. 1890)
  1978   – Giovanni Gronchi, Italian educator, soldier, and politician, 3rd President of the Italian Republic (b. 1887)
1979 – S. J. Perelman, American humorist and screenwriter (b. 1904)
  1979   – John Stuart, Scottish-English actor (b. 1898)
  1979   – Eugenio Mendoza, Venezuelan business tycoon (b. 1909)
1981 – Kannadasan Indian author, poet, and songwriter (b. 1927)
  1981   – Albert Cohen, Greek-Swiss civil servant and author (b. 1895)
  1981   – Lina Tsaldari, Greek politician (b. 1887)
1983 – Raymond Aron, French sociologist, political scientist, and philosopher (b. 1905)
1987 – Abdul Malek Ukil, Bangladeshi lawyer and politician (b. 1925)
1991 – Tennessee Ernie Ford, American singer and actor (b. 1919)
1992 – Herman Johannes, Indonesian scientist, academic, and politician (b. 1912)
  1992   – Orestis Laskos, Greek actor, director, and screenwriter (b. 1908)
1993 – Criss Oliva, American guitarist and songwriter (b. 1963)
1996 – Chris Acland, English musician and drummer of Lush (b. 1966)
1997 – Larry Jennings, American magician and author (b. 1933)
1998 – Joan Hickson, English actress (b. 1906)
  1998   – Hakim Said, Pakistani scholar and politician, 20th Governor of Sindh (b. 1920)
1999 – Nicholas Metropolis, Greek-American mathematician and physicist (b. 1915)
2000 – Leo Nomellini, Italian-American football player and wrestler (b. 1924)
  2000   – Joachim Nielsen, Norwegian singer-songwriter and poet (b. 1964)
2001 – Jay Livingston, American singer-songwriter (b. 1915)
  2001   – Micheline Ostermeyer, French shot putter, discus thrower, and pianist (b. 1922)
  2001   – Rehavam Ze'evi, Israeli historian, general, and politician, Tourism Minister of Israel (b. 1926)
2002 – Derek Bell, Irish harpist and composer (b. 1935)
2004 – Uzi Hitman, Israeli singer-songwriter (b. 1952)
2006 – Daniel Emilfork, Chilean-French actor (b. 1924)
  2006   – Christopher Glenn, American journalist (b. 1938)
2007 – Joey Bishop, American actor and talk show host (b. 1918)
  2007   – Teresa Brewer, American singer (b. 1931)
  2007   – Suzy Covey, American scholar and academic (b. 1939)
2008 – Urmas Ott, Estonian journalist and author (b. 1955)
  2008   – Levi Stubbs, American singer (b. 1936)
  2008   – Ben Weider, Canadian businessman, co-founded the International Federation of BodyBuilding & Fitness (b. 1923)
2009 – Norma Fox Mazer, American author and educator (b. 1931)
  2009   – Vic Mizzy, American composer (b. 1916)
2011 – Carl Lindner, Jr., American businessman (b. 1919)
2012 – Milija Aleksic, English-South African footballer (b. 1951)
  2012   – Émile Allais, French skier (b. 1912)
  2012   – Henry Friedlander, German-American historian and author (b. 1930)
  2012   – Stanford R. Ovshinsky, American scientist and businessman, co-founded Energy Conversion Devices (b. 1922)
  2012   – Kōji Wakamatsu, Japanese director, producer, and screenwriter (b. 1936)
2013 – Mother Antonia, American-Mexican nun and activist (b. 1926)
  2013   – Terry Fogerty, English rugby player and coach (b. 1944)
  2013   – Arthur Maxwell House, Canadian neurologist and politician, 10th Lieutenant Governor of Newfoundland and Labrador (b. 1926)
  2013   – Lou Scheimer, American animator, producer, and voice actor, co-founded the Filmation Company (b. 1928)
  2013   – Rene Simpson, Canadian-American tennis player (b. 1966)
2014 – Edwards Barham, American farmer and politician (b. 1937)
  2014   – Masaru Emoto, Japanese author and activist (b. 1943)
  2014   – Tom Shaw, American bishop (b. 1945)
  2014   – Berndt von Staden, German diplomat, German Ambassador to the United States (b. 1919)
2015 – Danièle Delorme, French actress and producer (b. 1926)
  2015   – Howard Kendall, English footballer and manager (b. 1946)
  2015   – Anne-Marie Lizin, Belgian lawyer and politician (b. 1949)
  2015   – Tom Smith, American businessman and politician (b. 1947)
2017 – Gord Downie, Canadian musician (b. 1964)
2019 – Elijah Cummings, American politician and civil rights advocate (b. 1951)

Holidays and observances
Christian feast day:
Andrew of Crete
Anstrudis
Catervus
Ethelred and Ethelberht
Florentius of Orange
François-Isidore Gagelin (one of Vietnamese Martyrs)
Hosea
Ignatius of Antioch
John the Short (John Colobus)
Marguerite Marie Alacoque (pre-1969 calendar, Visitadines)
Nothhelm
Rule of Andrew
Richard Gwyn
Victor of Capua
October 17 (Eastern Orthodox liturgics) 
International Day for the Eradication of Poverty
Loyalty Day (Argentina)
National Police Day (Thailand)

References

External links

 
 
 

Days of the year
October